Ctenomeristis paucicornuti is a species of snout moth in the genus Ctenomeristis. It was described by Marianne Horak in 1998 and is known from western Australia.

References

Moths described in 1998
Phycitini
Moths of Australia
Taxa named by Marianne Horak